In Hinduism, Kundalini is a form of divine feminine energy (or Shakti) believed to be located at the base of the spine, in the muladhara. It is an important concept in Śhaiva Tantra, where it is believed to be a force or power associated with the divine feminine or the formless aspect of the Goddess. This energy in the body, when cultivated and awakened through tantric practice, is believed to lead to spiritual liberation. Kuṇḍalinī is associated with Parvati or Adi Parashakti, the supreme being in Shaktism; and with the goddesses Bhairavi and Kubjika. The term, along with practices associated with it, was adopted into Hatha yoga in the 9th century. It has since then been adopted into other forms of Hinduism as well as modern spirituality and New age thought.

Kuṇḍalinī awakenings are said to occur by a variety of methods. Many systems of yoga focus on awakening Kuṇḍalinī through: meditation; pranayama breathing; the practice of asana and chanting of mantras. Kundalini Yoga is influenced by Shaktism and Tantra schools of Hinduism. It derives its name from its focus upon the awakening of kundalini energy through regular practice of Mantra, Tantra, Yantra, Asanas or Meditation.

Etymology 
The concept of Kuṇḍalinī is mentioned in the Upanishads (9th – 7th centuries BCE). The Sanskrit adjective  means "circular, annular". It is mentioned as a noun for "snake" (in the sense of "coiled") in the 12th-century Rajatarangini chronicle (I.2).  (a noun meaning "bowl, water-pot" is found as the name of a Nāga (serpent deity) in Mahabharata 1.4828). The 8th-century Tantrasadbhava Tantra uses the term kundalī, glossed by David Gordon White as "she who is ring-shaped".

The use of kuṇḍalī as a name for Goddess Durga (a form of Shakti) appears often in Tantrism and Shaktism from as early as the 11th century in the Śaradatilaka. It was adopted as a technical term in Hatha yoga during the 15th century, and became widely used in the Yoga Upanishads by the 16th century. Eknath Easwaran has paraphrased the term as "the coiled power", a force which ordinarily rests at the base of the spine, described as being "coiled there like a serpent".

In Shaiva Tantra

Kuṇḍalinī arose as a central concept in Shaiva Tantra, especially among the Śākta cults like the Kaula. In these Tantric traditions, Kuṇḍalinī is "the innate intelligence of embodied Consciousness". The first possible mention of the term is in the Tantrasadbhāva-tantra (eighth century), though other earlier tantras mention the visualization of Shakti in the central channel and the upward movement of prana or vital force (which is often associated with Kuṇḍalinī in later works). According to David Gordon White, this feminine spiritual force is also termed bhogavati, which has a double meaning of "enjoyment" and "coiled" and signifies her strong connection to bliss and pleasure, both mundane physical pleasure and the bliss of spiritual liberation (moksha), which is the enjoyment of Shiva's creative activity and ultimate union with the Goddess.

In the influential Shakta tradition called Kaula, Kuṇḍalinī is seen as a "latent innate spiritual power", associated with the Goddess Kubjika (lit. "the crooked one"), who is the supreme Goddess (Paradevi). She is also pure bliss and power (Shakti), the source of all mantras, and resides in the six chakras along the central channel. In Shaiva Tantra, various practices like pranayama, bandhas, mantra recitation and tantric ritual were used in order to awaken this spiritual power and create a state of bliss and spiritual liberation.

According to Abhinavagupta, the great tantric scholar and master of the Kaula and Trika lineages, there are two main forms of Kuṇḍalinī, an upward moving Kuṇḍalinī (urdhva) associated with expansion, and a downward moving Kuṇḍalinī (adha) associated with contraction. According to the scholar of comparative religion Gavin Flood, Abhinavagupta links Kuṇḍalinī with "the power that brings into manifestation the body, breath, and experiences of pleasure and pain", with "the power of sexuality as the source of reproduction" and with:

In Vaishnavism

Despite mostly being associated with Shaiva and Shakta traditions,the concept of Kundalini Shakti is not at all alien to Vaishnavism. Narada Pancharatra, A popular Vaishnava text gives a detailed, although somewhat different description of Chakras and Kundalini Shakti.

Description 

According to William F. Williams, Kuṇḍalinī is a type of religious experience within the Hindu tradition, within which it is held to be a kind of "cosmic energy" that accumulates at the base of the spine.

When awakened, Kuṇḍalinī is described as rising up from the muladhara chakra, through the central nadi (called sushumna) inside or alongside the spine reaching the top of the head. The progress of Kuṇḍalinī through the different chakras is believed to achieve different levels of awakening and a mystical experience, until Kundalini finally reaches the top of the head, Sahasrara or crown chakra, producing an extremely profound transformation of consciousness.

Swami Sivananda Saraswati of the Divine Life Society stated in his book Kundalini Yoga that "Supersensual visions appear before the mental eye of the aspirant, new worlds with indescribable wonders and charms unfold themselves before the Yogi, planes after planes reveal their existence and grandeur to the practitioner and the Yogi gets divine knowledge, power and bliss, in increasing degrees, when Kuṇḍalinī passes through Chakra after Chakra, making them to bloom in all their glory..."

Kundalini experiences

Invoking Kundalini experiences 

Yoga gurus consider that Kuṇḍalinī can be awakened by shaktipat (spiritual transmission by a Guru or teacher), or by spiritual practices such as yoga or meditation.

There are two broad approaches to Kuṇḍalinī awakening: active and passive. The active approach involves systematic physical exercises and techniques of concentration, visualization, pranayama (breath practice) and meditation under the guidance of a competent teacher. These techniques come from any of the main branches of yoga, and some forms of yoga, such as Kriya yoga, Kundalini yoga and which emphasize Kuṇḍalinī techniques.

The passive approach is instead a path of surrender where one lets go of all the impediments to the awakening rather than trying to actively awaken Kuṇḍalinī. A chief part of the passive approach is shaktipat where one individual's Kuṇḍalinī is awakened by another who already has the experience. Shaktipat only raises Kuṇḍalinī temporarily but gives the student an experience to use as a basis.

The twentieth century yogi and mystic Gopi Krishna, who helped to bring the concept of Kuṇḍalinī to the Western world, stated that

The American comparative religions scholar Joseph Campbell describes the concept of Kuṇḍalinī as "the figure of a coiled female serpent—a serpent goddess not of "gross" but "subtle" substance—which is to be thought of as residing in a torpid, slumbering state in a subtle center, the first of the seven, near the base of the spine: the aim of the yoga then being to rouse this serpent, lift her head, and bring her up a subtle nerve or channel of the spine to the so-called "thousand-petaled lotus" (Sahasrara) at the crown of the head...She, rising from the lowest to the highest lotus center will pass through and wake the five between, and with each waking, the psychology and personality of the practitioner will be altogether and fundamentally transformed."

Hatha yoga 

According to the Goraksasataka, or "Hundred Verses of Goraksa", hatha yoga practices such as the mudras mula bandha, uddiyana bandha, and jalandhara bandha,  and the pranayama practice of kumbhaka can awaken Kundalini. Another hatha yoga text, the Khecarīvidyā, states that khechari mudra enables one to raise Kundalini and access the stores of amrita in the head, which subsequently flood the body.

Shaktipat 

The spiritual teacher Meher Baba emphasized the need for a master when actively trying to awaken Kuṇḍalinī:

In his book, Building a Noble World, Shiv R. Jhawar describes his Shaktipat experience at Muktananda's public program at Lake Point Tower in Chicago on 16 September 1974 as follows:

Kundalini awakening 
The experience of Kuṇḍalinī awakening can happen when one is either prepared or unprepared.

According to Hindu tradition, in order to be able to integrate this spiritual energy, a period of careful purification and strengthening of the body and nervous system is usually required beforehand. Yoga and Tantra propose that Kuṇḍalinī can be awakened by a guru (teacher), but body and spirit must be prepared by yogic austerities, such as pranayama, or breath control, physical exercises, visualization, and chanting. The student is advised to follow the path in an open-hearted manner.

Traditionally, people visited ashrams in India to awaken their dormant kundalini energy with regular meditation, mantra chanting, spiritual studies and physical asana practice such as kundalini yoga.

Religious interpretations

Indian interpretations 

Kuṇḍalinī is considered to occur in the chakra and nadis of the subtle body. Each chakra is said to contain special characteristics and with proper training, moving Kuṇḍalinī through these chakras can help express or open these characteristics.

Kuṇḍalinī is described as a sleeping, dormant potential force in the human organism. It is one of the components of an esoteric description of the "subtle body", which consists of nadis (energy channels), chakras (psychic centres), prana (subtle energy), and bindu (drops of essence).

Kuṇḍalinī is described as being coiled up at the base of the spine. The description of the location can vary slightly, from the rectum to the navel. Kuṇḍalinī is said to reside in the triangular sacrum bone in three and a half coils.

Swami Vivekananda describes Kuṇḍalinī briefly in his book Raja Yoga as follows:

When Kuṇḍalinī Shakti is conceived as a goddess, then, when it rises to the head, it unites itself with the Supreme Being of (Lord Shiva). The aspirant then becomes engrossed in deep meditation and infinite bliss. Paramahansa Yogananda in his book God Talks with Arjuna: The Bhagavad Gita states:

Paramahansa Yogananda also states:

Krishnamacharya, often called the "father of modern yoga", described kuṇḍalinī differently. To him, Kuṇḍalinī is not an energy that rises: it is a blockage that prevents prāṇa vāyu (breath) from entering the suṣumnā and rising. This interpretation came partly from his own experience and partly from teachings of two sects of Vishnu-worshiping temple priests.

Western significance 

Sir John Woodroffe (1865–1936) – also known by his pseudonym Arthur Avalon – was a British Orientalist whose published works stimulated a far-reaching interest in Hindu philosophy and Yogic practices. While serving as a High Court Judge in Calcutta, he studied Sanskrit and Hindu Philosophy, particularly as it related to Hindu Tantra. He translated numerous original Sanskrit texts and lectured on Indian philosophy, Yoga and Tantra. His book, The Serpent Power: The Secrets of Tantric and Shaktic Yoga became a major source for many modern Western adaptations of Kundalini yoga practice. It presents an academically and philosophically sophisticated translation of, and commentary on, two key Eastern texts: Shatchakranirūpana (Description and Investigation into the Six Bodily Centers) written by Tantrik Pūrnānanda Svāmī (1526) and the Paduka-Pancakā from the Sanskrit of a commentary by Kālīcharana (Five-fold Footstool of the Guru). The Sanskrit term "Kundali Shakti" translates as "Serpent Power". Kundalini is thought to be an energy released within an individual using specific meditation techniques. It is represented symbolically as a serpent coiled at the base of the spine.

When Woodroffe later commented upon the reception of his work he clarified his objective, "All the world (I speak of course of those interested in such subjects) is beginning to speak of Kundalinî Shakti." He described his intention as follows: "We, who are foreigners, must place ourselves in the skin of the Hindu, and must look at their doctrine and ritual through their eyes and not our own."

Western awareness of Kuṇḍalinī was strengthened by the interest of Swiss psychiatrist and psychoanalyst Dr. Carl Jung (1875–1961). Jung's seminar on Kundalini yoga presented to the Psychological Club in Zurich in 1932 was widely regarded as a milestone in the psychological understanding of Eastern thought and of the symbolic transformations of inner experience. Kundalini yoga presented Jung with a model for the developmental phases of higher consciousness, and he interpreted its symbols in terms of the process of individuation, with sensitivity towards a new generation's interest in alternative religions and psychological exploration."

In the introduction to Jung's book The Psychology of Kundalini Yoga, Sonu Shamdasani puts forth "The emergence of depth psychology was historically paralleled by the translation and widespread dissemination of the texts of yoga... for the depth psychologies sought to liberate themselves from the stultifying limitations of Western thought to develop maps of inner experience grounded in the transformative potential of therapeutic practices. A similar alignment of "theory" and "practice" seemed to be embodied in the yogic texts that moreover had developed independently of the bindings of Western thought. Further, the initiatory structure adopted by institutions of psychotherapy brought its social organization into proximity with that of yoga. Hence, an opportunity for a new form of comparative psychology opened up."

The American writer William Buhlman, began to conduct an international survey of out-of-body experiences in 1969 in order to gather information about symptoms: sounds, vibrations and other phenomena, that commonly occur at the time of the OBE event.  His primary interest was to compare the findings with reports made by yogis such as Gopi Krishna who have referred to similar phenomena, such as the "vibrational state" as components of their kundalini-related spiritual experience. He explains:

Sri Aurobindo was the other great scholarly authority on Kuṇḍalinī, with a viewpoint parallel to that of Woodroffe but of a somewhat different slant - this according to Mary Scott, herself a latter-day scholar on Kuṇḍalinī and its physical basis, and a former member of the Theosophical Society.

New Age 
Kundalini references may be found in a number of New Age presentations, and is a word that has been adopted by many new religious movements.

Psychology 
According to Carl Jung "... the concept of Kundalini has for us only one use, that is, to describe our own experiences with the unconscious ..." Jung used the Kundalini system symbolically as a means of understanding the dynamic movement between conscious and unconscious processes.

According to Shamdasani, Jung claimed that the symbolism of Kuṇḍalinī yoga suggested that the bizarre symptomatology that patients at times presented, actually resulted from the awakening of the Kuṇḍalinī. He argued that knowledge of such symbolism enabled much that would otherwise be seen as the meaningless by-products of a disease process to be understood as meaningful symbolic processes, and explicated the often peculiar physical localizations of symptoms.

The popularization of eastern spiritual practices has been associated with psychological problems in the west. Psychiatric literature notes that "since the influx of eastern spiritual practices and the rising popularity of meditation starting in the 1960s, many people have experienced a variety of psychological difficulties, either while engaged in intensive spiritual practice or spontaneously." Among the psychological difficulties associated with intensive spiritual practice we find "Kundalini awakening," "a complex physio-psychospiritual transformative process described in the yogic tradition." Researchers in the fields of Transpersonal psychology, and Near-death studies have described a complex pattern of sensory, motor, mental, and affective symptoms associated with the concept of Kundalini, sometimes called the Kundalini syndrome.

The differentiation between spiritual emergency associated with Kuṇḍalinī awakening may be viewed as an acute psychotic episode by psychiatrists who are not conversant with the culture. The biological changes of increased P300 amplitudes that occurs with certain yogic practices may lead to acute psychosis. Biological alterations by Yogic techniques may be used to warn people against such reactions.

Some modern experimental research seeks to establish links between Kuṇḍalinī practice and the ideas of Wilhelm Reich and his followers.

See also 
 Mystical experience

References

Further reading

External links 

  Kundalini - An Occult Experience, G. S. Arundale (1938).

Chakras
Energy (esotericism)
Hindu philosophical concepts
Hindu tantra
New Age
Religious practices
Spiritual practice
Tantric practices
Theosophical philosophical concepts
Vitalism
Yoga concepts
Nāgas